Primera División de México (Mexico First Division) Invierno 1997 is a Mexican football tournament - one of two short tournaments that take up the entire year to determine the champion(s) of Mexican football. It began on Friday, July 25, 1997, and ran until October 26, when the regular season ended. U.A.N.L. was promoted to the Primera División de México thus, Pachuca was relegated to the Primera División A. In the final Cruz Azul defeated León and became champions for the 8th time.

Final Standings (groups)

Final Standings (general)

Top scorers

Goals scored throughout the entire tournament including Repechaje, Quarterfinals, Semifinals and Finals.

Playoffs

References

External links
 Mediotiempo.com (where information was obtained)

1997A
Mexico
1997–98 in Mexican football